The 1986 season of the Australian Women's National Basketball League (WNBL) was the sixth season of competition since its establishment in 1981. A total of 13 teams contested the league, and Nunawading Spectres emerged as champions.

Ladder

Finals

Season Awards

References

https://web.archive.org/web/20120318214857/http://www.wnbl.com.au/fileadmin/user_upload/Media_Guide/2011_12/Team_Profiles/10041_BASKAUST_MEDIA_GUIDE_2011-12_WNBL_BACK.pdf

1986
1986 in Australian basketball
Aus
basketball